Michael Castro may refer to:

Michael Castro (footballer) (born 1989), Ecuadorian footballer
Michael Castro (poet), U.S. poet and translator